Babes in Toyland is a 1986 American made-for-television Christmas musical film directed by Clive Donner and starring Drew Barrymore, Richard Mulligan, Eileen Brennan and Keanu Reeves. Based on the 1903 operetta of the same title by Victor Herbert and Glen MacDonough, this version features a new score by Leslie Bricusse along with select portions of Herbert's score.

Shot on location in Munich, West Germany, in summer 1986, it was broadcast on NBC on December 19, 1986 and released on VHS in 1991. The film was shortened to 94 minutes for overseas theatrical release; it is this version that received a worldwide home media release, leaving the original 145-minute cut unreleased (check the Availability section below).

Plot
Lisa Piper, an eleven-year-old girl from Cincinnati, Ohio, takes care of her siblings and cooks for her family because her father's passing has made her grow up too fast. She has no time for toys, and refuses to be treated as a child. Her older sister Mary works in a toy store run by a man who sexually harasses her and is enraged when everyone leaves in anticipation of a blizzard on Christmas Eve. Mary and her boyfriend Jack are taking Lisa and their friend George home when the snowy roads cause an accident, where Lisa is thrown out of the car and transported to Toyland. 

Lisa arrives just before Mary Contrary is to be wedded to the unpleasant Barnaby Barnacle, although Mary loves Barnaby's nephew, Jack Nimble. Lisa stops the wedding and, with her new friends, finds out that Barnaby plans to take over Toyland. Lisa, Mary, Jack, and Georgie Porgie go to the kindly Toymaster for help, but he can only help them if Lisa really believes in toys. Barnaby confronts them and the Toymaster, finally showing his true colors, and steals a flask containing distilled evil that the Toymaster had been collecting, before leaving Lisa and company to be eaten by Trollog, a vulture-like monster with a single enchanted eye that Barnaby uses to spy on his enemies. They escape by blinding Trollog with paint and locking him in a chest, but are captured and imprisoned one by one in Barnaby's hidden fortress.

Barnaby reveals that he had been creating an army of trolls to take over Toyland, and then attempts to corrupt his captives into being his servants with the contents of the flask, stating he would use it to make Mary his Troll Princess and transform Lisa into a monster akin to Trollog. However, Lisa proves to be immune to the evil, and manages to reverse the effects on her friends. After escaping from Barnaby's stronghold, they return to the Toymaster. By now, Barnaby has ordered his trolls to attack Toyland, where they harass and capture residents. Lisa's newfound belief animates an army of life-sized toy soldiers that the Toymaster had created, and they drive Barnaby into the Forest of the Night. Having lost control of his creatures and having failed at making Lisa his new Trollog, Barnaby is then banished from Toyland. Jack inherits the trust to the Cookie Factory. Jack and Mary are then married with Georgie as best man and Lisa as maid of honor. Lisa is taken home by the Toymaster — who is revealed to be Santa Claus — in a sleigh with wooden reindeer. They travel across the Milky Way until she wakes up at home, as though it has all been a dream (as in The Wizard of Oz). However, she notices a toy soldier identical to the ones from Toyland standing under the Christmas Tree, which promptly salutes her.

Cast

Musical numbers
 "C-I-N-C-I-N-N-A-T-I" – Jack, Lisa, George and Mary
 "Toyland" – Toyland chorus
 "May the Years to Come" – Widow Hubbard and children
 "Let's Hear It!" – Georgie and Toyland chorus
 "We'll Think of Something" – Lisa, Georgie and Mary
 "It's the Feeling" – Mary and Jack
 "Monsterpiece" – Barnaby
 "I Live in Two Worlds" – Lisa
 "C-I-N-C-I-N-N-A-T-I" (Reprise) – Lisa, Jack, Mary and Georgie
 "Eyes of a Child" – Toymaster
 "May the Years to Come" – Toyland chorus
 "Eyes of a Child" (Reprise) – Toymaster and Lisa
 "Toyland" – Lisa

Deleted scenes
Many deleted scenes were musical numbers such as "We'll Think of Something", "It's the Feeling", "I Live in Two Worlds", "Eyes of a Child (Reprise)" and "Toyland". Other transitional dialogue was missing from the European theatrical release; these scenes weren't featured on VHS.

Availability
The original 145-minute cut was never legally seen outside of television. However, through VHS recordings of these airings, it is currently available on YouTube, labeled as a "Director's Cut". The edited version is available to stream on Amazon Prime Video.

See also
 List of Christmas films

References

External links
 
 

1986 television films
1986 films
1980s Christmas films
1980s fantasy adventure films
American television films
American children's adventure films
American children's fantasy films
American Christmas films
American coming-of-age films
American fantasy adventure films
American fantasy comedy films
American musical fantasy films
Christmas television films
1980s English-language films
Films directed by Clive Donner
Orion Pictures films
Films set in Cincinnati
Films about sentient toys
Films about children
Films about siblings
Films about child abduction in the United States
1980s musical fantasy films
NBC network original films
Films shot in Munich
1980s American films
Films shot at Bavaria Studios